B C Nirmal born 19 February 1952, is an Indian Professor of Law specialised in International law, Human rights. He is Vice Chancellor at National University of Study and Research in Law, Ranchi, Jharkhand.  Till recently, he was Head and Dean of Law School, Banaras Hindu University (Varanasi). He has also been the Vice-President of Indian Society of International Law (ISIL, New Delhi), Vice President of All India Law Teachers Congress,  Member of Executive Council, Indian Society of International Law, New Delhi and Member of Governing Council of Indian Law Institute, New Delhi. He is also a Member of the Academic Council of Banaras Hindu University, Varanasi, Deen Dayal University, Gorakhpur. Before he took on the post of Vice Chancellor he was a member of the Academic Council and Professor of the Gujarat National Law University, Gujarat.

Biography 
In 2012 B C Nirmal was appointed Dean of the Faculty of Law of the Banaras Hindu University for a term of 3 years. Under his leadership, the law school held its first international conference on international environmental law, commercial law, law of information technology and legal studies and gathered 400 delegates came from 18 states and 7 countries. Nirmal created the  BHU Law School Newsletter , a quarterly which he is editor.

In 2014, was appointed by the Jharkhand High Court Vice Chancellor at National University of Study and Research in Law, Ranchi, Jharkhand.

He is the author of four books and numerous articles in the branch of law.

Publications 

 The right to self-determination in international law: evolution, U.N. law and practice, new dimensions, Deep & Deep Publications, 1999, 2007, 
 With Ramaa Prasad Dhokalia, International Court in Transition: Essays in Memory of Professor Dharma Pratap, Foreword by Ranganath Misra, Chugh Publications, Allahabad, 1994,  
 The Right of Self-Determination of the Tibetan People. Approaches and Modalities,  in Tibetan people's right of self-determination: report of the Workshop on Self-determination of the Tibetan People: Legitimacy of Tibet's Case 1994/1996, India, Tibetan Parliamentary and Policy Research Centre, 1996
 Aadhunik Antarrashtriya Vidhi : EK Parichay, Indian Society of International Law under a project sponsored by the Ministry of Laws Justice, 1998

References 

 https://web.archive.org/web/20120322203022/http://www.isil-aca.org/executive-council.htm#vice-president
 http://www.ailtc.org/office_bearers.htm
 http://www.kppub.com/articles/pharmaceutical-industries-of-india-010/indian-pharmaceutical-industry.html
 https://books.google.com/books/about/The_Right_to_Self_Determination_in_Inter.html?id=hV-IHGFv1SoC&redir_esc=y
 http://www.tpprc.org/publication/tibetan_peoples_right_of_self_determination-wsdtp-1997.pdf
 http://sikkimnow.blogspot.in/2011/11/su-organises-national-seminar-on.html
 http://m.timesofindia.com/PDATOI/articleshow/12736634.cms
 http://www.worldlii.org/int/journals/ISILYBIHRL/2001/6.html

External links 

1952 births
Indian legal scholars
Banaras Hindu University alumni
Deans of law schools in India
Living people
Place of birth missing (living people)
Indian legal writers
Heads of universities and colleges in India